No Reins is the ninth studio album by Australian group Little River Band. No Reins was released in July 1986 and peaked at number  85 on the Kent Music Report Albums Chart. It was the band's last studio album with John Farnham on lead vocals.

In 1997, the CD was re-release on One Way Records contained two bonus tracks.

Track listing 
"Face in the Crowd" (G. Goble) - 4:38
"It's Just a Matter of Time" (G. Goble) - 4:47
"Time for Us" (G. Goble, W. Nelson, D. Scheibner) - 4:42
"No Reins on Me" (G. Goble) - 4:37
"When the War Is Over" (S. Prestwich) - 5:09
"Thin Ice" (G. Goble, W. Nelson) - 4:27
"How Many Nights" (G. Goble) - 4:35
"Forever Blue" (Stephen Edward Foster, G. Goble) - 5:06
"Paper Paradise" (D. Hirschfelder, W. Nelson) - 4:10
"It Was the Night" (G. Goble) - 5:57
Bonus CD tracks
  "Netherlands" (B. Birtles) - 3:35
  "St. Louis" (H. Vanda, G. Young) - 4:15

Personnel
Little River Band:
John Farnham – lead vocals, backing vocals
Graham Goble – guitar, backing vocals
David Hirschfelder – keyboards, backing vocals
Stephen Housden – lead guitar
Wayne Nelson – bass guitar, backing vocals, lead vocals
Steven Prestwich – drums

Charts

References 

1986 albums
Capitol Records albums
EMI Records albums
Little River Band albums
One Way Records albums